Kingfisher Tower is a  folly, built by Edward Clark in 1876, on the eastern shore of Otsego Lake at Point Judith. It is located north of Cooperstown, New York near County Highway 31. The tower was used in a scene in a movie in 1911.

It is a Gothic Revival structure built by Clark "to beautify the lake" and "to provide construction jobs during an economic turndown". Clark made his fortune investing in Isaac Singer's sewing machine company, and the structure now belongs to his descendants. It is on private property and is usually approachable only from the lake. The structure was designed by architect Henry J. Hardenbergh.

References

 The Freeman's Journal (Cooperstown, Otsego County, N.Y.) September 07, 1876. page 3, image3 (online at nyshistoricnewspapers.org)
http://www.startsandfits.com/hardenbergh/kingfisher.html
http://www.dupontcastle.com/castles/kingfish.htm

Henry Janeway Hardenbergh buildings
Towers in New York (state)
Folly buildings in the United States
Folly towers
1876 establishments in New York (state)
Towers completed in 1876